Susan Shaw (29 August 192927 November 1978) was an English actress.

Biography
Shaw was born Patricia Gwendoline Sloots in West Norwood, London, to Edward John Sloots and Lillian Rose Lewis. She had wanted to become a dress designer and was working as a typist at the Ministry for Information when she did a screen test for the J. Arthur Rank Organisation. They signed her to a term contract and trained her at its "charm school".

She had a bit part in the musical London Town (1946) and a larger part in another musical, Walking on Air (1946). She had a small role in The Upturned Glass (1947) and Jassy (1947). Shaw was in Holiday Camp (1947) which introduced the Huggett family, although she did not play a Huggett.

Shaw was given her most noticeable role to date in It Always Rains on Sunday (1947) for Ealing. She had another decent support part in My Brother's Keeper (1948) at Gainsborough and London Belongs to Me (1948), in the latter replacing Pat Roc who pulled out.

Leading lady
Shaw's first lead came in To the Public Danger (1948) a short feature directed by Terence Fisher. She had a role in one of the segments of Quartet (1948) then when Sydney Box decided to make a film series out of the Huggett family with Jack Warner, Shaw was cast as Susan Huggett. There were three in the series: Here Come the Huggetts (1948), Vote for Huggett (1948) and The Huggetts Abroad (1949). Shaw was the female lead in the comedies It's Not Cricket (1949) and Marry Me (1949) and one of many actresses in Train of Events (1949). She was by now one of the busiest young actresses in Britain.

Shaw played support in some thrillers – Waterfront (1950), The Woman in Question (1950) – before returning to leads in Pool of London (1951) with Bonar Colleano. Her marriage to Albert Lieven, with whom she had a daughter, ended in divorce in 1953, and in 1954, she married Colleano.

Shaw began to appear on television in One Man's Family (1951) and a BBC version of The Amazing Dr. Clitterhouse (1951). She was the female lead in some Bs: There Is Another Sun (1951), Wide Boy (1952), A Killer Walks (1952), The Large Rope (1953), and Small Town Story (1953). On TV she did Count Your Blessings (1953). In April 1951 the Daily Mail listed Shaw on a poll from over 2,000 readers as one of the most popular British female actress in the country (after Anna Neagle, Jean Simmons, Jean Kent, Glynis Johns, Greer Garson, Petula Clark, Margaret Rutherford and Patricia Dainton, and in front of Jane Wyman.)

She supported in some "A" films, such as The Intruder (1953) and The Good Die Young (1954) as well as Time Is My Enemy (1954) and played leads in Stolen Time (1955), Stock Car (1955), Fire Maidens from Outer Space (1956), the comedy Davy (1958), The Diplomatic Corpse (1958), and Chain of Events (1958) as well as the TV play You Can't Have Everything (1958).

Later career
In 1958, Colleano was killed in a traffic collision. Shortly before Colleano's death, the actor admitted he had liabilities of nearly £10,000 due to extravagant living. He and Shaw had a son Mark born in 1955.

In November 1959 Shaw married TV producer Ronald Rowson. The marriage ended officially in November 1960, Rowson claiming that Shaw had been unfaithful to him within two months of their marriage with writer Stanley Mann.

Badly affected by Colleano's death, Shaw began to drink heavily, and unable to care for her son Mark (born 1955) because of her emerging alcoholism, she gave him to his paternal grandmother to raise.

She resumed her career, appearing in Carry on Nurse (1959) and The Big Day (1960) and episodes of All Aboard (1959), Suspense (1960), Richard the Lionheart (1962), and No Hiding Place (1962). Her last films were Stranglehold (1963) and The Switch (1963).

She wound up living alone and broke in Soho. She died of cirrhosis of the liver and was cremated at Golders Green Crematorium, north London.  Her old friends were going to pay for the funeral but then the Rank Organisation stepped in to do it. "When we heard of the circumstances of her death we felt it was the least we could do," said a spokesman from the Rank Organisation. Charlie Stevenson, landlord of the Swiss Tavern in Old Compton Street, said, "She came in here every day. They say she died of cirrhosis of the liver and she lived next door to prostitutes in Soho. But this is Soho. We all live next door to prostitutes. We loved her and we weren't going to see her buried in a pauper's grave. Now we shall give the money to medical charities."

Critical assessment
The film historians Steve Chibnall and Brian McFarlane praise the "sulky, spiky tenacity that differentiated her from many of her contemporaries".

Filmography

References

 Leslie Halliwell, Halliwell's Who's Who in the Movies, 14th edition, 2001, edited by John Walker, published by HarperCollins.

External links

1929 births
1978 deaths
English film actresses
Actresses from London
Deaths from cirrhosis
20th-century English actresses
Alcohol-related deaths in England

People educated at the City of London School for Girls